The Pincher Creek Panthers were a Junior A ice hockey team in the Alberta Junior Hockey League from Pincher Creek, Alberta.  Founded in 1972 as The Pass Red Devils, the team relocated to Pincher Creek for the 1976–77 season.  The Panthers lasted two years before relocating again to Calgary to become the Calgary Chinooks. After renaming to the Calgary Spurs in 1979 and then the Calgary Royals in 1990, the franchise became the Calgary Mustangs franchise in 2010.

Season-by-season record

Note: GP = Games played, W = Wins, L = Losses, T = Ties, Pts = Points, GF = Goals for, GA = Goals against

See also
 List of ice hockey teams in Alberta

References
Alberta Junior Hockey League website
AJHL Annual Guide & Record Book 2006-07

Defunct Alberta Junior Hockey League teams
Defunct ice hockey teams in Alberta
Ice hockey clubs established in 1976
Defunct junior ice hockey teams in Canada